

435001–435100 

|-bgcolor=#f2f2f2
| colspan=4 align=center | 
|}

435101–435200 

|-id=127
| 435127 Virtelpro ||  || The Virtual Telescope Project, part of the Bellatrix Astronomical Observatory in Italy, is a remotely accessible research facility with robotic telescopes. Since 2006, it shares online images of astronomical events in real-time, including observations of transient near-Earth objects. || 
|-id=186
| 435186 Jovellanos ||  || Gaspar Melchor de Jovellanos (1744–1811), a Spanish statesman, philosopher, author, and major figure of the Enlightenment in Spain. || 
|}

435201–435300 

|-bgcolor=#f2f2f2
| colspan=4 align=center | 
|}

435301–435400 

|-bgcolor=#f2f2f2
| colspan=4 align=center | 
|}

435401–435500 

|-bgcolor=#f2f2f2
| colspan=4 align=center | 
|}

435501–435600 

|-id=552
| 435552 Morin ||  || Julien Morin (born 1983), a French astrophysicist and a lecturer at the University of Montpellier. || 
|}

435601–435700 

|-bgcolor=#f2f2f2
| colspan=4 align=center | 
|}

435701–435800 

|-id=728
| 435728 Yunlin ||  || Yunlin County, a county in western Taiwan. || 
|}

435801–435900 

|-bgcolor=#f2f2f2
| colspan=4 align=center | 
|}

435901–436000 

|-id=950
| 435950 Bad Königshofen ||  || The city of Bad Königshofen is a spa town in the Franconian part of the Grabfeld region in Bavaria, Germany. The earliest known mention of it is from the year 741 CE, but settlements existed much earlier. It still preserves many remains of an impressive star-shaped fortress from the early 18th century. || 
|}

References 

435001-436000